Just for Laughs Radio is a Sirius XM Radio channel featuring uncensored comedy from Canada. It was created in November 2005 as a result of the Canadian Radio-television and Telecommunications Commission's (CRTC) regulations for Canadian content on the XM Radio Canada platform, originally as Laugh Attack until 2013 and then as Canada Laughs from 2013 to 2019.

In conjunction with the Just for Laughs comedy festival, the channel was rebranded as Just for Laughs Radio on February 25, 2019 and will broadcast content from Just for Laugh events as well as independent content by Canadian comics.

History

As Canada Laughs, the channel featured uncensored Canadian stand-up and sketch comedy.

This channel, The Verge, Radio Parallèle, and/or ATN-Asian Radio were sometimes preempted by XM Radio Canada in order to air extra NHL play-by-play on channels 235 - 239.

Laugh Attack was not added to Sirius after the Sirius/XM merger in 2008, as the Canadian Sirius and XM affiliates did not merge until 2011.

Laugh Attack was renamed Canada Laughs and made available on SIRIUS and XM in May 2013.

Rebranding as Just for Laughs
In February 2019, SiriusXM announced a branding deal with the Just for Laughs comedy festival, which would see the channel rebranded as Just for Laughs Radio, and the programming extended to include archival comedy performances from the Just for Laughs library. The rebranding was heavily criticized by Canadian comedians, because the use of archival material — which would be open to international comedians as well — would vastly reduce the amount of broadcast time available to Canadian comedians. Many comedians, in fact, noted that their royalties from Canada Laughs airplay were their single largest and most reliable comedy-related income source.

On February 27, Just for Laughs announced a partial retreat, under which the station will retain the Just for Laughs branding but the 100 per cent Canadian content rule will be restored. They also modified the new name of the station to Just for Laughs Canada.

References

External links
 Laugh Attack

XM Satellite Radio channels
Sirius XM Radio channels
Satellite radio stations in Canada
Comedy radio stations in Canada
Radio stations established in 2005